148 may refer to:

148 (number), a natural number
AD 148, a year in the 2nd century AD
148 BC, a year in the 2nd century BC
148 (album), an album by C418
148 (Meiktila) Battery Royal Artillery
148 (New Jersey bus)

See also
 List of highways numbered 148